Count Otto Eduard von Zedlitz und Trützschler (23 March 1873 – 4 December 1927) was a German nobleman, naturalist, explorer and writer. He settled in to Tofhult, Sweden after World War I.

Von Zedlitz was born in Silesia at the family home in Schwentnig near Zobten. His parents were Karl Friedrich Wilhelm Constantin von Zedlitz-Trützschler (1833–1888) and Helene von Rohr (1839–1878). After the early death of his mother he was raised by an aunt in Altenburg. He was educated at Breslau. He joined for military service (Leibkürassieren Regiment) following which he travelled around Spitzbergen and the Arctic circle with Arthur Berger and J. Roth around 1900. He travelled to Tunisia with Paul W. H. Spatz (1865–1942) from 1904 to 1906, making large collections of birds. He made several more visits to Africa and again to the Arctic. In 1912 he met Lord Rothschild and Ernst Hartert in Algeria. For some time towards the end of World War I, he was posted to the Eastern Front where he explored the Pripyat Marshes. After the war, he moved to Sweden and settled in Tofhult in Kalv. His collections of more than 7000 skins was donated to the Stockholm Museum for which he received  a Linnaeus Medal from the Swedish Academy of Science.

Von Zedlitz described several bird taxa including Camaroptera harterti. Oscar Neumann named Bucanetes githagineus zedlitzi from one of his specimens after him in 1907. Anton Reichenow named Cisticola brachypterus zedlitzi after him. A couple of other taxa named after him are considered junior synonyms.

Publications 
Von Zedlitz wrote mainly in German and particularly in the Journal für Ornithologie. An incomplete list of publications includes:

References 

1873 births
1927 deaths
German ornithologists
Zedlitz family